Cassidie Cierra Burdick (born September 30, 1993) is an American basketball player who is currently playing for Valencia Basket Club.

High school
Burdick graduated from David W. Butler High School in 2011. She was one of five finalists for the Naismith National High School Player of the Year award in 2011.

College
Burdick graduated from The University of Tennessee in 2015. Burdick was named a UT Torchbearer in 2015.

Tennessee statistics
Source

WNBA
Burdick was drafted by the Los Angeles Sparks in 2015, but was cut before the season began. She then signed with the Atlanta Dream. Her career includes stints for the New York Liberty and the San Antonio Stars, before the latter was sold and moved to become the Las Vegas Aces. On July 31, 2020, Burdick signed a contract with the Aces to resume her WNBA career.

WNBA career statistics

Regular season

|-
| align="left" | 2015
| align="left" | Atlanta
| 11 || 4 || 18.9 || .425 || .000 || .875 || 3.2 || 1.2 || 0.9 || 0.5 || 0.8 || 4.4
|-
| align="left" | 2016
| align="left" | Atlanta
| 8 || 0 || 3.6 || .125 || .000 || .500 || 0.5 || 0.0 || 0.0 || 0.0 || 0.3 || 0.4
|-
| align="left" | 2017
| align="left" | New York
| 6 || 0 || 6.0 || .545 || 1.000 || .000 || 1.0 || 0.7 || 0.2 || 0.2 || 0.7 || 2.2
|-
| align="left" | 2017
| align="left" | San Antonio
| 4 || 0 || 12.5 || .818 || .000 || .000 || 1.5 || 1.3 || 0.3 || 0.0 || 1.0 || 4.5
|-
| align="left" | 2020
| align="left" | Las Vegas
| 13 || 0 || 2.2 || .286 || .000 || .000 || 0.4 || 0.2 || 0.0 || 0.0 || 0.1 || 0.3
|-
| align="left" | 2021
| align="left" | Phoenix
| 4 || 0 || 4.8 || .500 || .000 || .000 || 1.8 || 0.8 || 0.3 || 0.3 || 0.3 || 1.0
|-
| align="left" | 2021
| align="left" | Minnesota
| 3 || 0 || 3.3 || .667 || .000 || .667 || 0.3 || 0.0 || 0.0 || 0.0 || 0.0 || 2.0
|-
| align="left" | 2021
| align="left" | Seattle
| 7 || 0 || 5.0 || .250 || .000 || .500 || 1.7 || 0.4 || 0.3 || 0.3 || 0.3 || 0.4
|-
| align="left" | Career
| align="left" | 5 years, 6 teams
| 56 || 4 || 7.4 || .455 || .333 || .783 || 1.4 || 0.5 || 0.3 || 0.2 || 0.4 || 1.8

Playoffs

|-
| align="left" | 2020
| align="left" | Las Vegas
| 4 || 0 || 4.8 || .286 || .000 || .000 || 1.0 || 0.5 || 0.0 || 0.0 || 0.0 || 1.0
|-
| align="left" | Career
| align="left" | 5 years, 6 teams
| 4 || 0 || 4.8 || .286 || .000 || .000 || 1.0 || 0.5 || 0.0 || 0.0 || 0.0 || 1.0

International basketball
Burdick was a member of the following teams. In total she won four gold medals.
2010 FIBA U17 World Championship - Gold medal
2009 FIBA Americas U16 Championship - Gold medal
2009 FIBA Americas U16 Championship for Women - Gold medal
2011 USA Basketball U19 World Championship Team 
2010 USA U17 World Championship 
2009 USA U16 National Team

Personal life
Burdick's great grandfather Lloyd Burdick played for the Chicago Bears. She has a younger brother and two younger sisters. She grew up in Charlotte, NC.

References

External links

Ten Questions with Tennessee Lady Vols' Cierra Burdick
Cierra Burdick (@C_Burdick11)|Twitter
Butler Bulldogs bio|www.wsoctv.com
USA Basketball profile
WNBA profile

1993 births
Living people
American women's 3x3 basketball players
American women's basketball players
Atlanta Dream players
Basketball players from Charlotte, North Carolina
Forwards (basketball)
Las Vegas Aces players
Los Angeles Sparks draft picks
McDonald's High School All-Americans
Minnesota Lynx players
New York Liberty players
Parade High School All-Americans (girls' basketball)
Phoenix Mercury players
San Antonio Stars players
Seattle Storm players
Tennessee Lady Volunteers basketball players